Cassandra "Cassie" Lang is a character appearing in American comic books published by Marvel Comics. Created by David Michelinie and John Byrne, the character first appeared in Marvel Premiere #47 (April 1979) as Cassie Lang, in Young Avengers #6 (May 2006) as Stature and in The Astonishing Ant-Man #6 (May 2016) as Stinger. Cassandra is the daughter of superhero Scott Lang. A member of the Young Avengers and The Initiative and love interest of Iron Lad, she has the same powers as her father, the ability to shrink and grow in size, although she manifested these powers long after her first exposure to Pym Particles.

In the Marvel Cinematic Universe (MCU), the character was portrayed as a child by Abby Ryder Fortson in Ant-Man (2015) and Ant-Man and the Wasp (2018), and as a teenager by Emma Fuhrmann in Avengers: Endgame (2019) and Kathryn Newton in Ant-Man and the Wasp: Quantumania (2023).

Publication history

Created by David Michelinie and John Byrne, Cassie Lang first appeared in Marvel Premiere #47 (April 1979). She first appeared as Stature in Young Avengers #6 (May 2006), and adopted the identity of Stinger in The Astonishing Ant-Man #6 (May 2016).

Fictional character biography

Ant-Man's daughter
Cassie Lang is introduced to the Marvel Universe as the ill daughter of Scott Lang. Her congenital heart condition forces her father to steal Hank Pym's Ant-Man equipment and Pym Particles, which he uses to rescue Doctor Sondheim, the only doctor able to cure Cassie's condition, from Cross Technological Enterprises.

After the divorce of her parents, Cassie lives for most of her childhood with her father, whom she loves and admires greatly. Although Scott tries his best to keep his superhero life secret, Cassie gradually finds out that he is Ant-Man, and secretly experiments with his Pym Particle supplies on her own. She is fascinated by her father's life as a superhero, and generally has a good relationship with her father's colleagues; when she was younger, she even called Tony Stark "Uncle Tony".

Scott's time as an engineer for the Fantastic Four brings Cassie to the team's then-headquarters of Four Freedoms Plaza. In the spectacular environment Cassie calls home, she forges a strong friendship with the former ward of Doctor Doom, Kristoff Vernard. During the time they share a home with the Fantastic Four, Cassie helps Kristoff adjust to life outside of Doom's castle, and she develops a crush on him. It is also during this time that she meets her father in his Ant-Man identity, and confesses that she had known about it for a long time.

After the Fantastic Four go missing and Cassie's father finds himself without a job, Scott takes employment at Oracle, Inc. with the Heroes for Hire (H4H). While working with the Heroes for Hire, Cassie has further adventures, accidentally activating the Super-Adaptoid and receiving horrifying visions of things to come. The H4H easily defeated Super-Adaptoid, and Cassie's participation in these dark events help her father and his allies defeat Master of the World in a battle for the fate of the Earth. All of these adventures give Cassie a taste for the action-filled life of a superhero, but it causes her mother Peggy to take sole custody from Scott.

As a result of Cassie being kept away from her father Scott, she grows more and more bitter toward her mother, and even more so toward her stepfather Blake Burdick. As a police officer, he cannot stand the world of superheroes the young girl loves, and he unsuccessfully tries to keep Cassie and Scott apart. For years, Cassie visits her father whenever possible, much to her mother and stepfather's chagrin, until the events of "Avengers Disassembled", when Scott is killed due to the actions of an insane Scarlet Witch.

Cassie retreats into herself, blaming Blake for being unable to understand her as her father always did. Blake tries unsuccessfully to be a caring stepfather, despite being sometimes distant toward her, seeing his stepdaughter as a "less than brilliant" girl. Some time after her father's death, and after another confrontation with her mother and stepfather, Cassie decides to run away to Los Angeles to join the Runaways, but after seeing the "Young Avengers" on television just before leaving, she subsequently changes her plans, as she later tells Jessica Jones.

Young Avengers

Iron Lad, a younger version of classic Avengers foe Kang the Conqueror, desperate for help against his future self after learning what he will become, uses the Vision's database to track and recruit young superpowered individuals connected to the Avengers' history; however, Cassie Lang is not one of the individuals on the list. Wishing to join the Young Avengers, she and Kate Bishop meet the young heroes at the Avengers Mansion; when they refuse to let them join or to let her take her father's gear, she angrily rebukes them, only to discover much to her own shock that by doing so she had increased her size. She later confesses that she had repeatedly stolen Pym particles from her father for years, but until then it seemed they never had any effect on her. Cassie later displays the ability to also shrink.

Iron Lad assures her that if Vision had known she had developed powers, she would have been part of his plans for the Young Avengers, thus accepting her as a teammate; she then takes part in the battle against Kang, which ends in the villain's defeat. However, as the altered timeline causes several of them to disappear, Iron Lad realizes that he must return to his own time and accept the fact that he will become Kang, much to Cassie's sorrow, as she had fallen in love with him.

While Captain America and Iron Man order the team to disband, both Cassie and Kate refuse and convince the others to keep the team active; after initially considering Ant-Girl or Giant-Girl, she ultimately adopts the codename Stature, along with a new costume based on her father's. Despite this, she feels guilty when overhearing her mother and stepfather discussing the possibility of her being a member of the team, also showing that rage or guilt make her respectively grow or shrink, metaphorically reflecting her being a shrinking violet about her family issues. After deciding to continue her life as a superhero, Cassie overhears her stepfather talking to her mother. They suspect that she is secretly Stature, but refuse to believe it. Later, Jessica Jones talks to Cassie's mother and confirms Cassie's dual identity. Cassie's mother is overwhelmed by this news and begs Jessica not to tell her husband about this due to his hatred of superheroes; she also worries that although Cassie was cured of her heart condition, her heart might not be able to handle the strain of continuous size-changing. When Jessica Jones asks Cassie if there is not even a small part of her wishing for a normal life, Cassie replies, "Ms. Jones, my dad was Ant-Man. I never had a normal life."

In the Civil War limited series, Cassie, along with her fellow Young Avengers, join Captain America's resistance to the Superhero Registration Act; she and the rest of her team stay at a safe house, while Nick Fury arranges new secret identities for them. During this time, she participates in a rescue effort, which turns out to be a trap laid by Iron Man: during the subsequent battle, Goliath is killed by a clone of Thor and her teammate Wiccan is captured. Afterwards, Cassie opts to leave Captain America's side and to register, citing her reasons as wishing to fight villains rather than cops and other heroes.

The Initiative
Cassie Lang joins the Initiative, as a trainee. Along with fellow Initiative members Dusk, Tigra, Silverclaw, and Araña, she is ensnared by the Puppet Master. Although she (along with the others) is mentally controlled into fighting Ms. Marvel, she is eventually freed from the mind control.

Her time at Camp Hammond brings her in to contact with her father's successor as Ant-Man: Eric O'Grady. O'Grady makes several disparaging remarks about her father, not realizing that she is within earshot; this causes a literally giant-sized brawl between the two as both grow to their giant forms. After O'Grady picks up a bus and hits Lang with it, Henry Pym intervenes. Taskmaster breaks up the fight by attacking their now giant-sized Achilles tendons, bringing all three crashing to the ground.

Later, the Vision visits Cassie, disguising himself as Tony Stark to take her out on a date. After fighting off an attempt by A.I.M. to steal the Vision, he confesses that because he was programmed based on Iron Lad's mental patterns, he shares Iron Lad's attraction to her, and hopes that she can love him; Cassie is unsure, but does not reject him, telling him to give her time to sort things out.

Cassie accidentally injures her stepfather Blake while stopping the Growing Man. Her guilt causes her to continue shrinking down, and the other Young Avengers attempt to snap her out of it before she shrinks into non-existence. With the help of Patriot, she comes to terms with the responsibilities and risks of her position as part of the Young Avengers and the Initiative, reasoning that Blake also faces the risks as a policeman.

Secret Invasion
Stature fights against the Skrull invasion of Manhattan as part of the Initiative. She grows larger than the Skrull Yellowjacket and punches him out.

Dark Reign
In the aftermath of the Skrull invasion, Cassie Lang leaves the Initiative at the start of the Dark Reign storyline and rejoins the Young Avengers. Cassie and Vision (now seemingly in a relationship) fly to the Avengers Mansion ruins, having been summoned by Wiccan with warnings of a great magical threat. After finding their teammates turned to stone, they encounter the Scarlet Witch transporting them away to be a part of the Mighty Avengers, led by Hank Pym. Despite her evident and vocal distrust of Scarlet Witch, whom she holds responsible for her father's death, she remains on the team. During a confrontation with the Fantastic Four for a device of the late Bill Foster, she refuses to participate in the attack and instead warns them about what was really happening, citing her reluctance to fight those she feels are like family to her. Eventually, Cassie's distrust of Scarlet Witch leads her to expose her as Loki in disguise. While part of the team, Lang also fights a demi-god at Mount Wundagore and a homicidal ancient Inhuman.

Norman Osborn later mounts a full-scale attack on Asgard. Teaming up with the rest of the Mighty Avengers one last time, Cassie and Vision help stop the Thunderbolts from delivering Odin's Spear (an Asgardian weapon of virtually limitless power) to the Iron Patriot; in the battle, she also fights the new Ant-Man again.

Heroic Age
At some point, Cassie applies for a babysitter job with Jessica Jones and Luke Cage, though more in the hope of eventually finding her way into the ranks of the New Avengers rather than any dedication to babysitting itself; she is dismissed in favor of Squirrel Girl.

The Children's Crusade and death
When Wiccan's uncontrolled magical energy nearly kills several members of the Sons of the Serpent, the Avengers begin to fear that he might become another Scarlet Witch; they explain to the Young Avengers how the Scarlet Witch went insane after the loss of her twin boys, resulting in the death of the original Vision and Scott Lang, and rendering nearly all of the world's mutants powerless. When Wiccan feels unsure about what to do, Cassie suggests that they try to find the Scarlet Witch, believing that if they can show her that her children are alive, she may be able to reverse everything she has done, including her father's death.

During the team's search in Latveria, Cassie is reunited with Iron Lad, and, when he takes the team back to the period of Avengers Disassembled, she is able to bring her father forward in time to the present, avoiding his original death from the attack by Jack of Hearts. After she manifests her powers in front of him, Scott tells her he's proud of her.

After the Scarlet Witch is found, Dr. Doom steals her reality warping powers and fights the combined forces of the Avengers and X-Men. As Doom seemingly kills her father (who actually managed to shrink down and escape with minor wounds), a distraught Cassie charges the super-powered dictator, gaining time for Scarlet Witch and Wiccan to prepare a joint spell to remove his new powers; however, Doom retaliates by blasting Cassie with an explosive spell, killing her. Although Iron Lad offers to take her into the future to save her, his offer is rejected by the other Young Avengers, as it is more in line with what Kang would do than what an Avenger should do. While contemplating rebuilding the Vision (who Iron Lad destroyed in rage when he protested against his plans to save Cassie), the Young Avengers realize that they would have to tell a restored Vision about Cassie's death, and thus decide not to follow through with the rebuilding. Kate expresses her desire to believe that Vision and Cassie are somehow together in the afterlife. The team disbands and a statue of Cassie and the Vision's is built in their honor in the gardens of the mansion.

Resurrection

Bentley 23 (a clone of Wizard) of the Future Foundation later postulates that, due to the unstable nature of Pym Particles, Cassie's body could conceivably regenerate into an ionic form similar to the resurrection of Wonder Man; he suggests digging up the corpse to check, stating that he is sure his classmates are thinking the same thing.

During the AXIS storyline, Doctor Doom is transformed into a more heroic, altruistic form as a result of the battle with the Red Skull that involved a spell that inverted heroes and villains' personalities. Seeking redemption for his past crimes, but only able to draw on enough power to alter one key event, Doom chooses to use that power to resurrect Cassie. She is then seen tearfully reuniting with her father and his new girlfriend Darla Deering.

In the Ant-Man ongoing series, she is shown living a normal life as a middle-school student. Worried that Scott's lifestyle and actions might attract more danger to her, Cassie's mother decides to relocate to Miami despite Cassie's reluctance. Scott nonetheless decides to relocate there as well to stay near his daughter. She is later kidnapped by Crossfire on behalf of Augustine Cross of Cross Technological Enterprises; Cross believes that Cassie's Pym Particle-irradiated heart can sustain Darren Cross's sickly body. Scott didn't arrive in time to prevent the transplant of Cassie's heart (which caused the revived Darren Cross to shrink uncontrollably) and so Dr. Sondheim was forced to transplant another one in Cassie's body, with Scott slowing down her immune system enough to make sure it is not rejected. While Cassie survived, not knowing herself what had happened to her, Scott was so shaken up by that experience that he decided to leave her, reasoning that he cannot risk to put her in harm's way again and that she deserves a normal and happy life he cannot provide.

A now depowered Cassie struggles with her everyday activities, while feeling frustrated by her current status; feeling resentful over Scott's seeming disappearance, she is later shocked and outraged to find out that he was secretly following her around, watching over her. One day, she is reunited with Kate, who has found out about her resurrection; despite her lack of powers, she follows her friend to a Secret Empire hideout, but almost gets killed, which further fuels her frustration, despite Kate's assurances that she is still special her own way. However, Cassie ultimately decides to turn to the new Power Broker to regain her powers; although he realizes that she has no intention of actually becoming a supervillain, he tells her about Darren Cross having stolen her heart and that her father hid it from her. Power Broker offers a deal, in which he will grant her wish if she infiltrates Cross' base to shut him down; Cassie accepts, and adopts the new codename Stinger. When Scott learns about her disappearance, he rushes to help her, but ends up captured in her place; however, Cassie manages to get his crew to help him escape. In the end, though, because of Darla's show, they end up discovered by the police; to protect his daughter, Scott takes the blame and claims he kidnapped and forced her to help him. Cassie captures Power Broker shortly after her father's arrest. When Cassie finally confesses to her mother what she did, Peggy takes her to the trial, where Darren Cross in the Yellowjacket suit and his henchmen (Crossfire and Egghead) burst into the courtroom to get revenge on Scott. Cassie rushes to help her father, and the two make amends during the fight, which ends with Cassie defeating Cross. Cassie's mother is called as the final prosecution witness, but surprisingly she declares that Scott was innocent, as he always looked after Cassie and has always been her hero, admitting that he took the blame for what she did; this allowed Scott to be acquitted. Afterward, Cassie finally receives her mother's blessing as a superhero, and joins her father as a new crimefighting duo.

Powers and abilities

Cassie Lang has the ability to increase and decrease her size. Her abilities seemed to be fueled by her emotions. She grows when she gets angry and shrinks when she feels guilty. Cassie seems to have become more powerful since first demonstrating her powers, as she has in recent issues surpassed her previous growth limit. At first she struggled to shrink to 6 inches and grow to 10–15 feet.

As Stinger, she has a helmet similar to that of Ant-Man, which allows her to communicate with and control "over five thousands species of ants and insects"; she also sports a suit with bio-synthetic wings that allow her to fly, and that can fire bio-electric blasts from the wrists.

Reception 
Deirdre Kaye of Scary Mommy called Cassandra Lang a "role model" and "truly heroic." Melody MacReady of CBR.com ranked Cassandra lang 2nd in their "10 Best Versions Of Ant-Man" list, while Raguvarman Raguparan ranked her 6th in their "10 Strongest Pym Particle Users In Marvel" list, and Liz Wyatt ranked her 8th in their "10 Young Avengers Ranked By How Good They Would Be As Leader Of The Avengers" list.

Other versions

MC2

In MC2, Cassandra Lang is now a doctor and operates under the name Stinger on the group A-Next. Although she is the oldest member of A-Next, in her mid-20s, and the only one on the original team with a professional life and a scientific background, she is still doted on by her father, who constantly worries about her newfound superhero life. She possesses many abilities originally engineered by Henry Pym, including resizing, flying, communication with insects, and firing bioelectric "stinger" blasts (as well artificial "stingers" sedative darts), all based on her costume and helmet. She does not seem to be capable of increasing her size and strength, unlike her main continuity version.

Avengers Fairy Tales

In issue 3 of Avengers Fairy Tales, Cassie Lang is portrayed as Alice of Alice in Wonderland. She encounters Wonderland versions of the Young Avengers. At first, her emotions cause her to grow and shrink beyond her control. She also meets Wonderland versions of Ant-Man (Scott Lang) and Tigra.

What If?
In the What If story "The Leaving", which takes place fifty years into an alternate future, Cassandra is a nursemaid for the elderly Scarlet Witch.
In "What If Iron Man Lost the Armor Wars", Cassie is taken hostage by Justin Hammer to force Scott Lang's cooperation against his benefactor Tony Stark. When Hammer is later assassinated and his knowledge over the Iron Man armor claimed by A.I.M., Scott and Cassie are taken hostage by them as well, but are eventually freed by Stark clad in the Firepower armor.
In the "What If Civil War Ended Differently" segment titled "What If Captain America Led ALL the Superheroes against the Registration Act", Cassie was among the first superheroes killed in a confrontation with government-launched Sentinels during the first battle.

Children's Crusade
Cassie Lang, under the codename Stature, went with her team on the search for the Scarlet Witch. In the alternate future timeline glimpsed during the Children's Crusade, Cassie was shown as a member of the future Avengers under the codename Stinger. It was later revealed that it had been Wiccan, now renamed Sorcerer Supreme, posing as Stinger to get Iron Lad to go back in time.

Ultimate Marvel
The Ultimate Marvel version of Cassie Lang appears in Ultimate Comics: Ultimates initially as Giant-Woman, and later as Stature. A member of the Ultimates Reserves' Giant-Women squad, she was brainwashed by Thor's son Modi to battle Spider-Man but is defeated. Giant-Woman later recovers and rescues the shot down S.H.I.E.L.D. Helicarrier during a skirmish with HYDRA. Monica Chang subsequently offers Giant-Woman a spot on the Ultimates due to the bravery she displayed during the battle with HYDRA. However, Stature later resurfaced as a member of Nick Fury's Howling Commandos, as assistance against the Maker's Dark Ultimates.

In other media

Television
 Cassie Lang appears in The Avengers: Earth's Mightiest Heroes episode "To Steal an Ant-Man," voiced by Colleen O'Shaughnessey.
 Cassie Lang appears in the Ant-Man episode "Science Fair," voiced by Laura Bailey.

Film

Cassie Lang appears in films set in the Marvel Cinematic Universe. She first appears as a child in the films Ant-Man and Ant-Man and the Wasp, portrayed by Abby Ryder Fortson, before appearing as a teenager in Avengers: Endgame, portrayed by Emma Fuhrmann. In Ant-Man and the Wasp: Quantumania, she is portrayed by Kathryn Newton.

Video games
 Cassie Lang / Stature appears as playable character in Lego Marvel's Avengers.
 Cassie Lang / Stinger appears as a premium playable character in Marvel Avengers Academy.
 Cassie Lang / Stature appears in Marvel Snap.

Miscellaneous

 Cassie Lang is referenced in the MC Chris song "Nrrrd Grrrl": "Wanna conquer her like Kang, When you kiss like Cassie Lang."

References

Avengers (comics) characters
Characters created by David Michelinie
Characters created by John Byrne (comics)
Comics characters introduced in 1979
Fictional characters who can change size
Fictional female scientists
Marvel Comics female superheroes
Marvel Comics film characters
Marvel Comics child superheroes
Marvel Comics mutates
Teenage superheroes